John Morlock (April 7, 1916 – January 7, 1976) was an American football player. 

A native of McKeesport, Pennsylvania, Morlock attended Moundsville High School in West Virginia and then played college football and basketball at Marshall University.

He was selected by the Detroit Lions with the 126th pick in the 1940 NFL Draft. He appeared in four games as a halfback for the Lions during the 1940 season.

References

1916 births
1976 deaths
American football halfbacks
Detroit Lions players
Marshall Thundering Herd football players
Marshall Thundering Herd men's basketball players
Players of American football from Pennsylvania
Sportspeople from McKeesport, Pennsylvania
People from Moundsville, West Virginia